Akadimia Platonos literally meaning Plato's Academy, is a neighbourhood located  west-northwest of the downtown part of the Greek capital of Athens.

History

The area is named after Plato's Academy, which he founded in the area in 387 BC and which continued to operate until it was destroyed by the Roman dictator Sulla in 86 BC. Excavations of Ancient artefacts began in 1929 and continue to the present day, under the auspices of the third General Directorate of Antiquities.

The area saw housing developments in the early part of the 20th century when Athens began to grow. An industrial zone was also laid out during this time. The area was mostly urbanised during the period after World War II and the civil war.

Present day

The area is densely populated, with people mainly living in five to seven-story buildings.  Major streets bordering this subdivision include Lenorman Avenue to the east, Palamidou Street to the south and Athinon Avenue (GR-8 and GR-8A and E90 westbound.)

The two main squares are Akademia Platonos and Metaxa. The population is approximately 15,000.

Residential streets
Several residential streets are named after places in the Peloponnese, famous people, and myths.

Amenities
Akadimia Platonos has schools, lyceums (middle schools), gymnasia (secondary schools), churches, banks, shops and squares (plateies).  The nearest Athens Metro subway station is to the east (Metaxourgeio metro station).

Akadimia Platonos has also given its name to the title of a movie screened in Locarno Film Festival 2009 directed by Filippos Tsitos.

References

External links
Plato's Academy
Akademia Platonos on GTP Travel Pages (in English and Greek)
Movie Clips

Neighbourhoods in Athens